Julie is a 2006 Indian Kannada film by Poornima Mohan. The film is a remake of the 1975 Hindi film Julie, which is itself a remake of the 1974 Malayalam film Chattakari. The movie stars Bollywood actor Dino Morea in his Kannada debut and Ramya as a young woman that discovers that she has gotten pregnant after a one-night stand with her childhood sweetheart.

Plot
Julie is a young Christian woman who finds herself pregnant after having sex with Shashi, a Hindu follower and her childhood sweetheart. Faced with the choice of abortion or carrying the child to term, Julie chooses to keep the pregnancy a secret from Shashi and goes to a convent, where she will deliver the child and put it up for adoption. Afterwards Julie returns home in the hopes that Shashi will marry her now that she does not have a baby, as she thought that he would not have shown an interest in her otherwise. Despite her well-laid plans, Julie finds that things aren't so simple as that. Not only does her brother want her to move to England, but she also meets Richard, a man who doesn't care that she has had a baby out of wedlock. Ultimately Julie manages to reconcile with Shashi and live happily ever after.

Cast
 Ramya as Julie
 Dino Morea as Shashi
 Sundeep Malani as Mr. Gupta, Julie's boss
 Sihi Kahi Chandru
 Ramesh Bhat
 Chitra Shenoy

Music

Rajesh Ramanath had composed the songs for Julie and also used tunes from the 1975 film.

Reception
Critical and audience reception was largely negative.

References 

2006 films
2000s Kannada-language films
Kannada remakes of Malayalam films
Indian interfaith romance films
Films scored by Rajesh Ramnath
Indian pregnancy films